The Anglo-Argentine Tramways Company (Spanish: Compañía de Tranvías Anglo Argentina), known simply as La Anglo in Argentina, was a large transportation company which operated the majority of the trams in the Buenos Aires network, which was also one of the largest in the world at the time having lines totalling  in length. The company also created Buenos Aires' first underground tram line, which would go on to become Line A of the Buenos Aires Underground.  The company also owned other tramways around the country.

History
The company was founded in 1876 by British and Anglo-Argentine investors in order to acquire the existing Buenos Aires tramway network, within the context of the country's belle epoque, where it was receiving significant investments from foreign companies. By the turn of the century, the company owned a significant number of tramways throughout Argentina, most notably the Buenos Aires and Rosario Tramways. In Rosario, the company opened its first line in 1886 and later bought five of the local tramway companies, while operating  of lines there through concession.

Purchase by Sofina

In 1898, the Belgian company Sofina began acquiring shares in the AATC at a time when the company was electrifying its Buenos Aires network, where the company owned  of lines by this point, as well as the electrification of the Rosario network, which was completed in 1908. By 1907, Sofina created a new company Compagnie Générale de Tramways de Buenos Aires to absorb the Anglo-Argentine and purchase other companies in the city and already by 1909 it had become the largest transport company in Argentina. The newly formed company's shareholders were made up of a number of different nationalities and included prominent European investment banks such as Paribas and Deutsche Bank.

Line A

Construction of Line A of the Buenos Aires Underground began on 15 September 1911, with the German company Philipp Holzmann being contracted by the AATC to undergo the works. When the line was opened on 1 December 1913, it became the first Underground line in the southern hemisphere, Latin America and the Spanish-speaking world. During the line's opening, the company's president Samuel Hale Pearson companied the Argentine vice president Victorino de la Plaza and the city's mayor Joaquín de Anchorena on the inaugural trip.

The original Anglo-Argentine line ran underground from Plaza de Mayo in central Buenos Aires to the neighbourhood of Caballito, where it continued above-ground tram services through an access ramp at Primera Junta station, which also provided access to the company's main workshop and storage area at the Polvorín Workshop. The workshop operates to this day (albeit in a more minor role) and was built in 1914 to service the line's La Brugeoise and UEC Preston rolling stock.

Demise

In the years following the formation of the Compagnie Générale de Tramways de Buenos Aires, they came to own the vast majority of the Buenos Aires tram network, with the exception of a few Argentine companies such as the Lacroze Company's Tramway Rural. However, increased competition from bus travel and the construction of new lines for the Buenos Aires Underground, anti-monopoly laws and a devaluation of the Argentine peso all meant that the AATC was in an increasingly difficult situation by 1930.

By 1936, the company's accumulated losses had reached £2.5 million (around £92 million in 2005 money) while the company was facing serious competition from the Compañía Hispano Argentina de Obras Públicas y Finanzas (CHADOPyF, Hispanic-Argentine Company for Public Works and Finances), which had recently completed Line C and was close to completing Line D. That same year, the government of Buenos Aires also began to organise public transport under a large mixed holding company known as the Corporation for Urban Transport (Corporacion de Transportes Urbanos) which was put into effect in 1938.

The AATC remained largely independent, however in the post-war period, the political climate in Argentina had changed significantly and under the leadership of Juan Peron, the country's railways had been nationalised in 1948. That same year, the Argentine National Congress approved a law which would see the nationalisation of Buenos Aires' public transport in the shortest possible time frame. In 1951, a large portion of the Corporation for Urban Transport was bought up by the state for AR$400 million, while the corporation had already accumulated debts with the state worth AR$2 billion. All of the corporation's assets were then transferred over to the state in January 1952.

The AATC's shareholders did not recognise the purchase and – together with the Corporation for Urban Transport's other shareholders – made the British ambassador to Argentine intervene on numerous occasions. Argentina and the United Kingdom then reached an agreement in December 1952 to resolve the matter of the transferral of assets quickly, however, this would turn out to be fruitless. The conflict ensued until 1963, when it was ultimately taken to the Buenos Aires Court of Appeals, which recognised that the Argentine state was partly responsible for the loss of capital of the foreign shareholders.

Legacy

Though the Buenos Aires tramway network ceased widespread operations in the 1960s, along with the other cities in which the AATC operated, many remnants of the original company can still be seen. In Buenos Aires, the Polvorín Workshop still functions as the maintenance area for Line A of the Buenos Aires Underground, and is currently being put out of use and converted into a museum for the network.

The original Brugeoise cars are being restored to run tourist services on Line A and to be exhibited in different museums around the country. Meanwhile, the UEC Preston cars belonging to the company are used on Buenos Aires' heritage tramway, which runs in the neighbourhood of Caballito using parts of the AATC's original route. Similarly, Line A has preserved its original appearance and, along with the Brugeoise cars and workshop, is considered a national historic monument.

In Rosario and Buenos Aires, tracks can still be seen in some neighbourhoods while a project in Rosario may use some of the company's original segments upon re-activating the tramway.

Gallery

See also

 List of town tramway systems in Argentina
 Trams in Buenos Aires
 Trams in Rosario
 Line A (Buenos Aires Underground)
 Anglo-Argentines

References

External links
 

Defunct railway companies of Argentina
Tram transport in Argentina
Rail transport in Buenos Aires Province
Buenos Aires Underground
1876 establishments in Argentina
Railway companies established in 1876
Railway companies disestablished in 1952